Mount Barbas is a peak in the mountain range of Panachaiko in Peloponnese, Greece.

External links
 Hellenic Mountaineering Club of Patras (in Greek)

Barbas
Landforms of Achaea
Barbas